Donato Bottone (born 21 June 1988) is an Italian footballer, He didn't sign for Sondrio because he and his girlfriend, who is pregnant, did not like the city and went away before signing the contract with Sondrio Calcio

Biography
Born in Polla, Campania, Bottone started his career at Piedmontese club Villaggio Lamarmora and Biellese. On 22 August 2002 Bottone was signed by Juventus. He played for Juve youth system from under-15 team, U16, U17, U18 to the reserve team - Primavera. Bottone also signed a 4-year contract in summer 2007. On 6 August 2008 Bottone and Nicola Cosentini were left for Pro Patria. Bottone was signed by Pro Sesto in January 2009. The club unable to loan Bottone to lower divisions in summer 2009. Bottone became a member of the under-18 team as overage player in 2009–10 season. On 31 August 2010 Bottone was signed by French Ligue 2 club Clermont Foot on free transfer. He signed a 1-year contract. Bottone was injured and missed the whole 2011–12 season. Bottone obtained the license as youth team coach on 30 June 2012.

On 20 November 2012 Bottone was signed by Hungarian club Budapest Honvéd FC. Bottone played once for the second team on 17 November. On 10 December 2012 he was released. He was on trial for Santhià, Bra and Cuneo in 2013–14 season.

On 4 January 2016 Bottone was signed by Italian club Sondrio Calcio.
On 5 January 2016 Bottone changes idea because his girlfriend didn't like the city and the Sondrio Calcio infrastructure.

References

External links
 
 AIC Profile (data by football.it) 

Italian footballers
Juventus F.C. players
Aurora Pro Patria 1919 players
S.S.D. Pro Sesto players
Clermont Foot players
Budapest Honvéd FC II players
Serie C players
Ligue 2 players
Italian expatriate footballers
Italian expatriate sportspeople in France
Expatriate footballers in France
Italian expatriate sportspeople in Hungary
Expatriate footballers in Hungary
Association football forwards
People from Biella
Sportspeople from the Province of Salerno
1988 births
Living people
A.S.D. La Biellese players
Footballers from Piedmont
Footballers from Campania
Sportspeople from the Province of Biella